Sung Ching-yang (born 18 October 1992) is a Taiwanese inline speed skater and long track speed skater who specialises in the sprint distances. In international competitions he competes under the flag of Chinese Taipei.

At the 2010 Asian Games in Guangzhou, Sung won two gold medals in roller sports, winning both the 300 metres time trial and the 500 metres sprint.

In ice skating Sung participated in the 2013–14 ISU Speed Skating World Cup – Men's 500 metres and 2013–14 ISU Speed Skating World Cup – Men's 1000 metres and has represented Chinese Taipei at the 2014 Winter Olympics in both events in Sochi. In December 2013 he won a bronze medal at the 1000 metres at the 2013 Winter Universiade speed skating.

Ching-Yang became the first speed skater to represent his country at the Winter Olympics (in 2014). In 2017 he was named to Chinese Taipei's team at the 2017 Asian Winter Games in Sapporo, Japan.

Personal bests in speed skating
Sungs personal bests on the 500 and 1000 metres in long track speed skating are also national records for Taiwan.

References

1992 births
Living people
Taiwanese male speed skaters
Inline speed skaters
Olympic speed skaters of Taiwan
Speed skaters at the 2014 Winter Olympics
Speed skaters at the 2018 Winter Olympics
Asian Games medalists in roller sports
Asian Games gold medalists for Chinese Taipei
Roller skaters at the 2010 Asian Games
Speed skaters at the 2017 Asian Winter Games
Medalists at the 2010 Asian Games
Universiade medalists in speed skating
Universiade gold medalists for Chinese Taipei
Competitors at the 2013 Winter Universiade
Competitors at the 2017 Winter Universiade
Medalists at the 2017 Summer Universiade
21st-century Taiwanese people